Silvia Jerono Kemboi (born 11 December 1988) is a Kenyan long-distance runner who specializes in race walking.
She was the bronze medallist at the African Championships in 2022.

References

External links 
 Silvia Kemboi at World Athletics

1998 births
Living people
Kenyan female racewalkers
Kenyan female long-distance runners
21st-century Kenyan women